Calamar may refer to:

 Calamar, Guaviare, a town and municipality in Guaviare Department, Colombia
 Calamar, Bolívar, a town and municipality in Bolívar Department, Colombia
 Calamar (crater), on Mars
 Calamar (telenovela), a Colombian telenovela

See also
 Calamari (disambiguation)
 Calamar Municipality (disambiguation)
 Squid